Valley Mills Independent School District is a public school district based in Valley Mills, Texas (USA). The district is located in southern Bosque County and portions of McLennan and Coryell counties.

In 2009, the school district was rated "academically acceptable" by the Texas Education Agency.

Campuses
Valley Mills ISD has three campuses:

Valley Mills High School (Grades 9-12)
Valley Mills Junior High (Grades 7-8)
Valley Mills Elementary (Grades PK-6)

References

External links
Valley Mills ISD

School districts in Bosque County, Texas
School districts in McLennan County, Texas
School districts in Coryell County, Texas